Alexis Allart (born 7 August 1986 in Charleville-Mézières, Ardennes) is a French football forward who currently plays for USL Dunkerque of the Championnat National.

Career statistics

References

External links

France Football
Transfers Thai Premier League 2015-16, thai-fussball.com

1986 births
Living people
People from Charleville-Mézières
French footballers
AS Monaco FC players
Louhans-Cuiseaux FC players
R.E. Mouscron players
CS Sedan Ardennes players
US Boulogne players
LB Châteauroux players
FC Istres players
CA Bastia players
Ligue 1 players
Ligue 2 players
Championnat National players
Belgian Pro League players
Expatriate footballers in Thailand
Association football forwards
Sportspeople from Ardennes (department)
Footballers from Grand Est
French expatriate sportspeople in Thailand
French expatriate footballers
French expatriate sportspeople in Belgium
Expatriate footballers in Belgium